The Jews of Rusape, Zimbabwe are a group of people who practice a religion similar to Judaism. Their observance of Judaism is generally in accordance with that of mainstream Judaism practiced in other countries with the exception of a few key aspects. The Rusape Jews, believe that although Jesus was not the Messiah, he was a prophet. They believe that he did not rise to heaven as is taught in Christianity, but was rather buried in Israel as a regular man. The community's origins are attributed to an individual known as William S. Crowdy, who came to the community in the late 19th or early 20th century.

History

Crowdy was a Baptist deacon and former American slave. It is believed that Crowdy experienced a revelation in which he was told to initiate black people to Judaism. Within a short span of time after this revelation, Crowdy met Albert Christian, who settled in southern Africa and instructed his followers in the laws and customs of Judaism.

References

Groups claiming Jewish descent
Jewish Zimbabwean history
Jewish Christianity
Religion in Zimbabwe
Black Hebrew Israelites